Palazzo Aldobrandeschi is the seat of the provincial government of Grosseto, Italy, and it is located in Piazza Dante, the main square of the city.

History
It was built between 1900 and 1903 by architect Lorenzo Porciatti. It is a Gothic Revival building with the facade decorated by ogival mullioned windows and merlons. It houses the seat of the Province of Grosseto and was named after the ancient family Aldobrandeschi, since it was erroneously believed this was the location of the Aldobrandeschi's castle during the Middle Ages.

Bibliography

External links 
 Architectures of 19th century in Tuscany (Italian)

See also
Aldobrandeschi
Grosseto Cathedral

Aldobrandeschi
Gothic Revival architecture in Italy
Government buildings completed in 1903